Tomas Bata Memorial is functionalist building in Zlín, Czech Republic built in 1933. The Memorial was designed by the Czech architect František Lydie Gahura.

History
Tomas Bata Memorial is the most impressive architectural work of František Lydie Gahura, it is a modern paraphrase of the constructions of high gothic style period: the supporting system and colourful stained glass and the reinforced concrete skeleton and glass. The building process started in 1932 and the monument was open with ceremony on the day of the first anniversary of Tomáš Baťa death that is on 12 July 1933. Based on the proposals by František Lydie Gahura the monument was meant to be an entrance gate to a complex of four buildings of the learning institute. Between 1936 and 1939 only the Learning Institute I and II were built. In 1954 the monument was rebuilt (academic architect J. Staša) and turned into the House of Arts. Later to be used as an art gallery and philharmonic orchestra in Zlín. The memorial unfortunately lost its architectural qualities.

Architecture
Tomas Bata Memorial is the most valuable monument of the Zlín functionalism. The idea for the monument is simple - an empty prism placed on a visible spot above the town on the central axis of the ascending park space, made up of several modules of the Zlín 6.15 x 6.15 m frame and clad only with cathedral glass. Inside is Junkers F 13 aircraft in which Tomáš Baťa died in 1932. Gahura reduced the monument to three basic materials of Zlín architecture – concrete, steel and glass. Building's composition express the unique attributes of Tomáš Baťa: generosity, clarity, aspiration, optimism, simplicity and honesty.

Gallery

References

Modernist architecture in the Czech Republic
Functionalist architecture
Houses completed in 1933
Buildings and structures in Zlín
Bata Corporation
International Style (architecture)